Henry Gallop (21 August 1857 – 21 August 1940) was an English cricketer. He played for Gloucestershire between 1877 and 1883.

References

1857 births
1940 deaths
English cricketers
Gloucestershire cricketers
Cricketers from Bristol
People from Bitton